William "Ginger" Richardson (29 May 1909 – 29 March 1959)  often referred to as W.G. Richardson and by the nickname 'Ginger' to avoid confusion with teammate Bill Richardson, was an English professional footballer, who played as a centre forward.

He scored both goals for West Bromwich Albion when they won the 1931 FA Cup Final, beating their Midlands rivals Birmingham City 2–1.

He scored four goals within the space of five minutes, all within the first ten minutes of the match, for West Brom against West Ham United at Upton Park on 7 November 1931.
 
In the 1935–36 season, he scored 39 League goals, which is still West Bromwich Albion's club record for top scorer in the top division of the football league system.

Richardson was the nephew of the English cricketer, Tom Richardson. In 2004, he was named as one of West Bromwich Albion's 16 greatest players, in a poll organised as part of the club's 125th anniversary celebrations.

Richardson died on the field of play, during a charity match between a City of Birmingham 'All Stars XI' and a Television celebrity team, having stepped in at the last moment when the playing staff of Birmingham City were placed under quarantine due to a polio outbreak, which would claim the life of another former cup finalist, Jeff Hall a fortnight later.

Honours
West Bromwich Albion
FA Cup winners: 1931

References

External links
 William Richardson profile at TheFA.com
Englandstats.com profile

1909 births
1959 deaths
Footballers from County Durham
English footballers
English Football League players
First Division/Premier League top scorers
Hartlepool United F.C. players
Shrewsbury Town F.C. players
West Bromwich Albion F.C. players
England international footballers
Association football forwards
FA Cup Final players